Javier Carlos Acevedo (born January 28, 1998) is a Canadian competitive swimmer. He competes primarily in the backstroke events. Acevedo won two bronze medals at the 2017 World Aquatics Championships as part of both the mixed 4×100 m freestyle relay and the 4×100 m mixed medley relay. He has also won a gold medal at the 2015 FINA World Junior Swimming Championships in the 4×100 m mixed freestyle relay and a silver in the 50 m backstroke. Acevado was a former Junior world record holder in the 100 m backstroke event.

Career
The 2015 FINA World Junior Swimming Championships were Acevedo's first opportunity to compete for the national team on a world stage. At the junior championships he won the silver medal in the 50 m metre backstroke, while setting a personal best. This was his first individual international medal, Acevedo said that "I touched the wall properly which helped get the silver in a very tight race. It was very important because I know that I will have more out speed the next time I do it. I made sure I was mentally prepared before the race. I was confident." As part of Canada's mixed 4×100 m relay team at the junior worlds, he was the gold medal winner and world junior champ. He swam in that final together with Markus Thormeyer, Penny Oleksiak, and Taylor Ruck.

He set the Junior world record in the 100 m backstroke on his way to qualifying for the event at the 2016 Summer Olympics in the Canadian Olympic Trials. In 2016, he was named to Canada's Olympic team for the 2016 Summer Olympics where he swam to a 17th place finish in the 100 m backstroke, failing to qualify for the semi-finals. He was the youngest male swimmer on Canada's Olympic team at these games, competing at the age of 18.

Acevedo was next named to Canada's 2017 World Aquatics Championships team in Budapest, Hungary. He made it through to the semi-finals but finished with the 14th best time and out of the finals. On the same day he would compete in the 4×100 m mixed freestyle relay helping the team to a bronze. In regard to racing twice in the same night and still performing well enough to medal, Acevedo said that "It was pretty difficult, but I've done a lot of work in my training to be able to do that kind of stuff...I just had to work hard and get through it." Acevedo also competed in the 50 m backstroke, but once again failed to qualify for the finals finishing 16th in the semi-finals.

In June 2021, Acevedo was named to his second Canadian Olympic team. He competed in the Olympic debut of the mixed medley relay, but the Canadian team finished thirteenth in the heats and did not advance to the final.

At the 2022 World Aquatics Championships, Acevedo was part of the Canadian team for the 4×100 m mixed freestyle relay, winning the silver medal. He was the lone member of the Canadian team to participate in both the heats and the event final. He did not advance out of the heats of either the 50 or 100 m backstroke.

Named to Canada's team for the 2022 Commonwealth Games, Acevedo began the first day of the championships by winning the bronze medal in the mixed 4×100 m freestyle relay. The following day he won a bronze with the men's team in the 4×100 m freestyle. This was the first men's relay medal for Canada at a major event since the 2015 Pan American Games, and the first at the Commonwealth Games since 2006. Acevedo said on the occasion "this team is so strong and it gives us hope we can improve in the future." He went on to win an individual bronze medal in the 50 m backstroke in 24.97 seconds, lowering his own Canadian record from five years earlier. Acevedo swam the backstroke segment for Canada in the heats of the 4×100 m mixed medley. He was replaced by Kylie Masse in the final, but received a silver medal after the team finished second there.

Personal bests

References

External links
 
 
 
 
 
 

1998 births
Living people
Swimmers from Toronto
Sportspeople from Scarborough, Toronto
Canadian male backstroke swimmers
Swimmers at the 2014 Summer Youth Olympics
Swimmers at the 2016 Summer Olympics
Olympic swimmers of Canada
World Aquatics Championships medalists in swimming
Medalists at the FINA World Swimming Championships (25 m)
Pan American Games medalists in swimming
Pan American Games silver medalists for Canada
Swimmers at the 2019 Pan American Games
Medalists at the 2019 Pan American Games
Swimmers at the 2020 Summer Olympics
Georgia Bulldogs men's swimmers
Swimmers at the 2022 Commonwealth Games
Commonwealth Games medallists in swimming
Commonwealth Games silver medallists for Canada
Commonwealth Games bronze medallists for Canada
21st-century Canadian people
Medallists at the 2022 Commonwealth Games